Jan van Rensburg was a South African wrestler. He competed in the freestyle light heavyweight event at the 1920 Summer Olympics.

References

External links
 

Year of birth missing
Year of death missing
Olympic wrestlers of South Africa
Wrestlers at the 1920 Summer Olympics
South African male sport wrestlers
Afrikaner people
Place of birth missing